Torsted Parish is a parish in the Diocese of Aarhus in Horsens Municipality, Denmark.

Torsted is located on the southwestern outskirts of Horsens, 2 miles southwest of the city centre. Its parish number is 7966. In the Church of Denmark, it is a unit of Horsens provsti within the Diocese of Aarhus. Until the 1970 municipal reform, it was also a governmental unit as part of Hatting hundred. In 1924 it included settlements and estates named Torsted, Ørnstrup, Mosegaard and Thorstedhuse.

There is also a Torsted parish in Ringkøbing-Skjern Municipality, in western Jutland.

Notable people 
 Ole Sohn (born 1954 in Torsted) a Danish politician and author
 Steen Secher (born 1959 in Torsted) a Danish sailor, bronze medallist at the 1988 Summer Olympics and gold medallist at the 1992 Summer Olympics
 Birgitte Froberg (born 1969 in Torsted) a Danish sprint canoer who competed at the 1988 Summer Olympics

References

Horsens Municipality
Parishes of Denmark